Victor Anderson is a former London Assembly member, serving from 4 May 2000 to March 2003.

He worked as a researcher for Plaid Cymru-Green MP Cynog Dafis, as part of the deal that brought Dafis the Green Party's support.

He is also a published academic, writing for the New Economics Foundation. He is a supporter of the Green Economics Institute.

Bibliography
Alternative economic indicators : Victor Anderson. Routledge, London, 1991. 106 pp.

References

Year of birth missing (living people)
Living people
Green Party Members of the London Assembly